Sovereign Stone is a role-playing game that was originally produced by Sovereign Press, Inc and published by Corsair Publishing, based on the Sovereign Stone novels. The game was written by Don Perrin and Lester W. Smith.

Reception
Scott Haring reviewed the Sovereign Stone role-playing game for Pyramid.

References

D20 System
Fantasy role-playing games
Role-playing games introduced in 1999